A Mountie is a constable of the Royal Canadian Mounted Police. 

Mountie or Mounties may also refer to:

People
Jacques Rougeau (born 1960), a Canadian professional wrestler who performed as "The Mountie"
Mounties (band), a Canadian indie rock band

Film
 The Mountie (film), a 2011 Canadian film

School mascots and team names
Canada
Mount Allison Mounties, Mount Allison University, Sackville, New Brunswick

United States
Mapleton High School (Ashland, Ohio)
Mount Saint Charles Academy, Woonsocket, Rhode Island
Montclair High School (New Jersey)
Northwest High School (Michigan), Jackson, Michigan
Suffern High School, Suffern, New York

Sports clubs
Lethbridge Mounties, now the Lethbridge Black Diamonds, a minor-league baseball team in Lethbridge, Alberta, Canada
Paris Mounties, a junior ice hockey team in Paris, Ontario, Canada
Vancouver Mounties, a defunct minor-league baseball club in Vancouver, British Columbia, Canada
The Mounties Club, an athletic club in Mount Pritchard, New South Wales, Australia, whose teams include:
Mount Pritchard Mounties, a rugby league team in the Bundaberg Red Cup
Mounties F.C., now Mounties Wanderers, a football (soccer) club in the NSW State League Division One

See also
Mountaineer (disambiguation), for other athletic teams whose name is often shortened to Mounties